Patrick Lindesay Crawford Shepherd (17 March 1831 – 3 July 1903) was an Australian politician.

He was born in Sydney to nurseryman Thomas Shepherd and Jane Henderson. He was a stockman before joining his father at their nursery at Newtown. He established his own seed and plant business. On 19 May 1857 he married Isabella Deane, with whom he had ten children; a second marriage, around 1875 to Sarah Jane Una Barnier, produced a further seven children. He joined the Volunteer Artillery in 1861, retiring a major in 1876. In 1874 he was elected to the New South Wales Legislative Assembly for Nepean, but he retired in 1877. In 1888 he was appointed to the New South Wales Legislative Council, where he remained until his death at Burwood in 1903.

References

 

1831 births
1903 deaths
Members of the New South Wales Legislative Assembly
Members of the New South Wales Legislative Council
19th-century Australian politicians